Arthur Gooch (born 20 March 1931) is a former Australian rules footballer, who played in the Victorian Football League, (VFL).

Arthur Gooch played for Collingwood between 1950 and 1956.  Gooch was a member of the Magpies' winning grand final team against Geelong in 1953.

Gooch played with Box Hill in the VFA in 1957 and 1958.  In all he played 31 games and scored 4 goals for Box Hill and won the club's Best and Fairest in 1958.

External links

Australian rules footballers from Victoria (Australia)
Collingwood Football Club players
Collingwood Football Club Premiership players
Box Hill Football Club players
Living people
1931 births
One-time VFL/AFL Premiership players